Bautista, officially the Municipality of Bautista, is a 4th class municipality in the province of Pangasinan, Philippines. According to the 2020 census, it has a population of 35,398 people.

Bautista is called "The Walis Tambo (broom) Capital of Pangasinan". It is honored as the "Lupang Hinirang".

History

Boletin Ecclesiastico de Filipinas published that the Dominicans founded Pangasinan towns of Binalatongan (City of San Carlos, 1588), Calasiao, 1588, Mangaldan, 1600, Manaoag, 1608, Lingayen, 1614, Dagupan, 1614 and Telbang (now Bautista, 1614). A historian, Rosario Cortez, however, wrote that Bautista existed since 1686, but was removed to the Parish of Bayambang.

The "Rebirth of Bautista" as Municipality was only in 1900. Don Ramon Reynado became the first town executive along with other notable founder: Guillermo Agcaoile, Francisco Gonzales, Felipe Ramos, Dionisio Galvan, Teodoro Carungay, Claudio and Antonio Galsim, Marciano Guzman, Nicolas Galsim, Marcelino Villanueva and Eleno Cayabyab.

Bautista was dubbed "mercancia"  or "Melting Pot" (where cargoes due to Camiling, Tarlac were traded via the Agno River or by train).
The municipality was truly a melting pot, indicative of which is the diversity of people's dialects and languages. The residents of the town were Pangasinenses, Ilocanos, Tagalogs, Pampangos, Chinese and Spanish. The people of Nibaliw, Baluyot and Cabuaan are mostly Pangasinenses. The people of Nandacan, Villanueva, Poponto, Primicias, Artacho and Pogo are predominantly Ilocanos. Within the Poblacion, one would be able to meet a number of people with different persuasions, ideals and expression in varied dialects and language.

Bautista natives' livelihoods are farming, broom making (fiber, tanobong and midribs), dressmaking, sawali making, buro making, building construction, auto mechanics, basketry, bag making, blacksmithing, pottery, ceramics and hollow blocks making and rattan crafts. The residents also have clay, cattle, poultry, bamboo, rattan, anahaw, abiang, fishes, sugar, basi, vinegar and coconut, including watermelon and onion, its principal product.

1907 to 1920 was its golden years until San Quintin-Paniqui rail road line was opened, thus Bautista lost to Rosales, Tayug and San Quintin. The big floods of 1934 and 1972 almost annihilated the flood-prone town.

Alcala March to Righteousness

The Alcala December 5, 2012 "March to Righteousness" was launched to have joined the Ombudsman of the Philippines observance of December 9 International Anti-Corruption Day United Nations Convention against Corruption (UNCAC), General Assembly of the United Nations (UN).
Recently, Alcala held its Incident Command System Training, the Bautista LGU-Pangasinan, the Malacanang & Google hold MapUp Session, the 23rd National Statistics Month (NSM) and Philippine Civil Service Anniversary 2012.

Geography

Bautista is located east of Pangasinan part of the Pangasinan's Fifth Congressional District with a land area of 8,213 hectares. Bautista is bounded by Alcala, Pangasinan, north; Bayambang, south, Agno River and Moncada, Tarlac, east.

Barangays

Bautista is politically subdivided into 18 barangays: These barangays are headed by elected officials: Barangay Captain, Barangay Council, whose members are called Barangay Councilors. All are elected every three years.

 Artacho
 Baluyot
 Cabuaan
 Cacandongan
 Diaz
 Nandacan
 Nibaliw Norte
 Nibaliw Sur
 Palisoc
 Poblacion East
 Poblacion West
 Pogo
 Poponto
 Primicias
 Ketegan
 Sinabaan
 Vacante
 Villanueva

Barangay Poblacion West is the site where the lyrics of the Philippine National Anthem were written, and it is known as the "Home of the Philippine National Anthem". In 1899, Jose Palma wrote his poem "Filipinas" which became the Anthem's lyrics.

Climate

Demographics

Economy

Government
Bautista, belonging to the fifth congressional district of the province of Pangasinan, is governed by a mayor designated as its local chief executive and by a municipal council as its legislative body in accordance with the Local Government Code. The mayor, vice mayor, and the councilors are elected directly by the people through an election which is being held every three years.

Municipal seal
The official seal of Bautista has "BAYAN NG BAUTISTA" amid the green color (agricultural area, the gear, farming developments, the carabao).

Elected officials

Tourism

Bautista celebrates Philippine Eagle Week from June 4, 2012, to June 10, 2012 (Presidential Proclamation No. 79).

In the "Parada Na Dayew", a festivals of Pangasinan towns in the 432nd anniversary of April 11, 2012, Bautista Float Entry "Lupang Hinirang" claimed the 1st runner-up trophy with a cash of P 75, 000 and trophy.

Maekrisanne Resort, Bautista Police Building, Bautista Municipal Park, Bautista Municipal Auditorium, Rural Bank of Bautista (Pangasinan), Inc. and Jose Palma Historic Place
2nd Buntis Congress was held at Bautista (August 15, 2012, at Maekrisanne Garden Resort attended by 134 participants).

1723 Parish Church of St. John the Baptist 

Bautista derived its name from Saint John the Baptist ("Voice of the Wilderness and the Precursor of the Lord"), hence its town fiesta on June 23 and 24, the nativity of St. John, the Baptist.

The Parish Church of St. John the Baptist (F-1723), Poblacion East, Bautista, 2424 Pangasinan has a population of 19,547 Catholics with Parish Priests, Rev. Rafael Mesa and Rev. Rolando A. Fernandez. It is a part of the Vicariate IV: Queen of Peace, under the jurisdiction of the Roman Catholic Archdiocese of Lingayen-Dagupan. Its Vicar Forane is Rev. Fr. Alberto T. Arenos.

Education

Bautista Schools include Baluyot, BNHS, Bautista Central School, CNHS and St. John Institute and A. Diaz, Sr. Elementary School, inter alia.

Gallery

References

Sources

Boletin Ecclesiastico de Filipinas
Rosario Cortez, PANGASINAN, 1901-1986: A Political, Socio Economic and Cultural History

External links

 Bautista Profile at PhilAtlas.com
 Municipal Profile at the National Competitiveness Council of the Philippines
 Bautista at the Pangasinan Government Website
 Bautista Website
 Local Governance Performance Management System
 [ Philippine Standard Geographic Code]
 Philippine Census Information

Municipalities of Pangasinan
Populated places on the Agno River